Elijah Ward (September 16, 1816 – February 7, 1882) was a U.S. Congressman during the American Civil War and the Reconstruction era.

Early life
Ward was born in Sing Sing (now Ossining), New York.  He pursued classical studies at the Common Schools in Sing Sing.

Career
In 1833, he came to New York City to engage in commercial pursuits and, at the same time, study law in the office of his uncle, Maj. Gen. Aaron Ward, who was then a U.S. Representative from Westchester County.  In 1838, he began attending the law department of New York University, and was admitted to the bar in 1843 and thereafter commenced practice in New York City. In 1839, he was elected president of the Mercantile Library Association of New York City.

Ward was judge advocate general of the State 1853 to 1855, and was appointed on Governor Horatio Seymour's staff with the rank of Brigadier general. He was also a delegate to the Democratic National Convention in 1856.

U.S. Congress
He was elected as a Democrat, over George Briggs on the "Native American" ticket and Gen. James W. Nye, the Republican candidate (who later became the Governor of Nevada Territory and a U.S. Senator from Nevada), to the Thirty-fifth Congress serving from March 4, 1857 to March 3, 1859, but was an unsuccessful candidate for reelection in 1858.

He was subsequently elected to the Thirty-seventh and Thirty-eighth Congresses serving from March 4, 1861 to March 3, 1865, but again was an unsuccessful candidate for reelection in 1864, losing to Henry Jarvis Raymond. He resumed the practice of law in New York City, and then was elected to the Forty-fourth Congress and served one term, from March 4, 1875 to March 3, 1877, as he was an unsuccessful candidate for reelection in 1876, losing to General Anson G. McCook.  While in Congress, he served on the Committees on Roads and Canals and in his last term, he was chairman of the Committee on Commerce.

Personal life
On August 28, 1866, Ward was married to Ellen Eliza (née Cairns) Stuart (d. 1893), who was previously married to Lt. Robert Stuart, who died in Warrenton, Virginia while fighting for the Union Army during the U.S. Civil War.

He died in Roslyn in Nassau County, New York on Long Island on February 7, 1882.  He was buried in Woodlawn Cemetery in the Bronx.

Legacy
After his death, his widow donated a memorial horse trough in Roslyn Harbor, New York in his memory. Shortly after her death in 1893, her children erected the Clocktower and gave it to the Town as a memorial.

References

External links
 
 
 Speech of Hon. Elijah Ward, of New York, in the House of Representatives, February 21, 1877

1816 births
1882 deaths
People of New York (state) in the American Civil War
People from Ossining, New York
Democratic Party members of the United States House of Representatives from New York (state)
New York University School of Law alumni
19th-century American politicians